The 2016–17 EuroCup Basketball Playoffs were played from 28 February to 31 March or 5 April with the second or third leg, if necessary, of the 2017 EuroCup Finals, to decide the champions of the 2016–17 EuroCup Basketball. Eight teams competed in the playoffs.

Times up to 25 March 2017 (quarterfinals and semifinals) were CET (UTC+1), thereafter (finals) times were CEST (UTC+2).

Format

In the playoffs, teams played against each other must win two games to win the series. Thus, if one team wins two games before all three games have been played, the game that remains is omitted. The team that finished in the higher Top 16 place will play the first and the third (if it is necessary) legs of the series at home. The playoffs involves the eight teams which qualified as winners and runners-up of each of the four groups in the Top 16.

Qualified teams

Standings

Bracket

Quarterfinals

The first legs were played on 28 February, the second legs on 3 March 2017 and the third legs, if necessary, on 8 March 2017.

|}

First leg

Second leg

Third leg

Semifinals

The first legs were played on 14 March, the second legs on 17 March, and the third legs, if necessary, on 22 March 2017.

|}

First leg

Second leg

Third leg

Finals

The first leg were played on 28 March, the second leg on 31 March, and the third leg, if necessary, on 5 April 2017.

|}

First leg

Second leg

Third leg

External links
Official website

2016–17 EuroCup Basketball